Gustav Alfred Senn (9 November 1875 in Basel, Switzerland – 10 July 1945 in Basel) was a Swiss botanist and historian of botany.  He was a student of Georg Klebs and worked on the movement and morphological changes of chloroplasts.  He also studied Theophrastus.

Selected works

 Die Gestalts- und Lageveränderung der Pflanzen-Chromatophoren, Leipzig: Wilhelm Engelmann, 1908.
 Die Entwicklung der biologischen Forschungsmethode in der Antike und ihre grundsätzlitche Förderung durch Theophrast von Eresos, Aarau: H. R. Sauerländer & Company, 1933.  Series "Veröffentlichungen der Schweizerischen Gesellschaft für Geschichte der Medizin und der Naturwissenschaften", #8.  .

References

 Obituary, d'Arcy W. Thompson, Nature 156 (8 September 1945), p. 289, .
 Obituary, F. E. Weiss, Proceedings of the Linnean Society of London 158, #1, pp. 70–71, .
 "Notes and Correspondence", George Sarton and Aubrey Diller, Isis 36, #2 (Jan. 1946), pp. 130–134, . (obituary)
 "Gustav Senn (1875–1945): The pioneer of chloroplast movement research", Hironao Kataoka, Journal of Integrative Plant Biology 57 #1 (Jan. 2015), pp. 4–13, .

1875 births
1945 deaths
20th-century Swiss botanists
Scientists from Basel-Stadt